Aaron's Way is an American family drama series television series that aired on NBC from March 9 to May 25, 1988. It stars Merlin Olsen as Aaron Miller, the husband and father of an Amish family that moves to California. It follows the attempts of relatives to adapt to Californian culture while retaining their personal values. Also appearing on it were Samantha Mathis and Belinda Montgomery.

Synopsis
Aaron Miller's eldest son, Noah, has left the Amish community for the world, but Aaron kept in touch with him using a post office box. Aaron then learns that Noah died in a surfing accident, and goes to California for his funeral. While there, he learns that Noah had been living with a woman named Susanna Lo Verde, who owns a vineyard and is pregnant by Noah.

Aaron returns to Pennsylvania to consider what to do. His wife is surprised that he kept in touch with Noah, and then a relative of Susanna arrives by motorcycle. He relates her difficulties, and Aaron expresses his opinion to his wife that they need to go help her.

To Susanna's surprise, the family arrives and begins helping out while trying to cope with the unfamiliar society and technology. The three Miller children are enrolled in the public school system.

Subsequent episodes of this short-lived series deal with the continuing clash (and sometimes complementary meeting) between the Millers and their worldly hosts and neighbors. Aaron's dedication to the values of integrity and justice bend a few dishonest people their way.

Cast
Merlin Olsen as Aaron Miller
Belinda Montgomery as Sarah Miller
Samantha Mathis as Roseanne Miller
Erin Chase as Martha Miller
Scott Curtis as Frank Miller
Kathleen York as Susannah Lo Verde
Jessica Walter as Connie Lo Verde
Christopher Gartin as Mickey Lo Verde
Pierrino Mascarino as Mr. Benvenuto

Episodes

References

External links 
 
 

1980s American drama television series
1988 American television series debuts
1988 American television series endings
Television shows set in California
Amish in popular culture
NBC original programming
Television series by Lorimar-Telepictures